Rosso is a city of south-western Mauritania.

Rosso, Italian for red, may also refer to:
Rosso (band), a Japanese musical group
Rosso Kumamoto, a Japanese football club
Rosso Corporation, a Japanese model car manufacturer
Rosso (bus company), a bus operator in north-west England
Rosso (restaurant), a Finnish restaurant chain serving Italian cuisine

People with the name
Rosso (surname), a surname (including a list of people with the name)
Rosso Fiorentino ( 1495–1540), Italian painter